Loka Prakash Malla, also known as Lokaprakash, (Nepali: लोकप्रकाश मल्ल) was a Malla dynasty king and the King of Patan. He succeeded Yoganarendra Malla as the king in 1605 and reigned for a brief period of eleven months.

Life 
Lokaprakash was the son of Yogamati, the daughter of Yoganarendra Malla. Yoganarendra had died without any heirs and the feudal lords of Patan installed Lokaprakash as the ruler. Since Lokaprakash was an infant, his mother was influential in the kingdom. Lokaprakash died after eleven months of reign due to smallpox and was succeeded by Indra Malla, the son of a sister of Yoganarendra Malla.

References 

17th-century Nepalese people
18th-century Nepalese people
Nepalese monarchs
1697 births
1706 deaths